Poku Adu Gyamfi is a Ghanaian Politician and a member of the Third Parliament of the Fourth Republic Republic representing the Bosomtwe Constituency in the Ashanti Region of Ghana.

Early life and education 
Adu was born Bosomtwe, a town in the Ashanti Region of Ghana. He attended the University of Hohenhem and  also the Institute of Agricultural Sciences in Tropics (Hans-Ruthenberg-Institute).

Politics 
Adu was first elected into Parliament on the ticket of the New Patriotic Party during the December 1996 Ghanaian General Elections. He polled 11,606 votes out of the 22,537 valid votes cast representing 34.60% against Joseph Oteng-Adjei and NDC member who polled 7,339 votes, Bernard Kwabena Asamoah a CPP member who polled 3,389 votes and Joseph Appiah a PNC member who polled 203 votes. In the 2000 Ghanaian General Elections for the Bosomtwe Constituency in the Ashanti Region of Ghana, he polled 15,160 votes out of the 22,85 valid votes cast representing 63.30% against Joseph O. Adjei an NDC member who polled 7,361 votes representing 32.20%, Suleiman Mohammed a PNC member who polled 225 votes representing 1.00% and Violet Kankam a CPP member who polled 129 votes representing 0.60%. He was defeated by Simon Osei Mensah in the 2004 NPP parliamentary primaries.

Career 
He was a member of Parliament from 1997 to 2005 for the Bosomtwe Constituency in the Ashanti Region of Ghana.

References 

Living people
New Patriotic Party politicians
Ghanaian MPs 2001–2005
University of Hohenheim
People from Ashanti Region
Ghanaian MPs 1997–2001
Year of birth missing (living people)